WANF (channel 46) is a television station in Atlanta, Georgia, United States, affiliated with CBS. It is the flagship property of locally based Gray Television and is co-owned with independent station WPCH-TV (channel 17) and low-power, Class A Telemundo affiliate WKTB-CD (channel 47). WANF and WPCH-TV share studios on 14th Street Northwest in Atlanta's Atlantic Station district, while WANF's transmitter is located in the city's Woodland Hills section.

The station was built in 1971 as WHAE-TV (later WANX-TV), owned by the Christian Broadcasting Network (CBN). Originally a nonprofit operation airing religious programs, the station gradually became a more commercially oriented independent station and broadened its programming to include older movies and family-friendly classic TV shows. CBN sold the station to Tribune Broadcasting in 1983, and the call sign was changed to WGNX in 1984. Tribune substantially built up the station, upgrading programming and turning it into Atlanta's top-rated independent local station; it also started a local newscast for the station in January 1989.

After a major switch of television affiliations in Atlanta in 1994, WGNX became Atlanta's new CBS affiliate and the only such station owned by Tribune. However, news was not seriously expanded until after the Meredith Corporation acquired the station in 1999 as part of a purchase-and-trade with Tribune. The WGCL-TV call sign was adopted in 2000 as part of a major, but short-lived, rebrand of the station to "Clear TV" and its newscasts to Clear News. Meredith also assumed operating control of WPCH-TV in 2011, purchasing the station outright in 2017. Over the course of its news-producing history, the station has generally been a revolving door of management and presenting talent with little ratings success.

The acquisition of Meredith by Gray Television in 2021 has resulted in an increased infusion of resources into the station's newsroom as well as other investments by Gray in Atlanta-area media. As part of a wide-scale rebrand of its news service to Atlanta News First, WGCL-TV changed its call sign to WANF on October 3, 2022.

History

As an independent station

Construction and CBN ownership 
On January 23, 1968, the Christian Broadcasting Network (CBN), owned by evangelist Pat Robertson, filed an application with the Federal Communications Commission (FCC) for authority to build a new television station on channel 46 in Atlanta. The application was granted on May 5, 1968, but after several changes in the proposed studio location, the station began broadcasting on June 6, 1971, as WHAE-TV from leased studio facilities in the Protestant Radio and TV Center on Clifton Road. Originally, it operated for six hours a day on weekdays and twelve on Sundays. It was largely an unprofitable operation with, as John Carman writing for The Atlanta Constitution put it, "no particular interest in profits". In September 1977, WHAE-TV changed its call sign to WANX-TV, with a station spokesman stating it wanted "a new identity" and a "fresh start".

Over the course of the 1970s and early 1980s, WHAE-TV/WANX-TV, like other CBN independent stations, eventually adopted a program schedule consisting of older, "family-friendly" classic shows as well as some religious programming, such as CBN's The 700 Club. Movies, a common staple of independents, had been completely absent from the station's lineup until 1974, when the outlet moved into studios on Briarcliff Road that had been vacated by WATL (channel 36), which had been temporarily shuttered in 1971, and thereafter owned by Production 70s, a video production house that declared bankruptcy. This facility had been built around a 1916 red clapboard house. It also began to operate on a more commercial basis in 1980, following a restructuring of the CBN media operation into the commercially authorized Continental Broadcasting Network, turning its first-ever profit in 1982. By 1983, it had tied WTBS (channel 17), Ted Turner's independent-turned-superstation, in the local ratings, and The 700 Club was the only religious program on its weekday lineup.

Tribune ownership 
In July 1983, Tribune Broadcasting of Chicago announced it would spend $32 million to purchase WANX-TV from CBN. It was the company's fifth station, purchased as CBN was seeking to raise money for other operations and retire some of its debts. On March 1, 1984, the call sign was changed to WGNX, stated to be a mixture of the call signs of Tribune stations WGN-TV in Chicago and WPIX in New York City.

WGNX emerged as the number-one local independent in Atlanta under Tribune's ownership. A reported $40 million in program expenditures lifted costs market-wide for syndicated shows and gave channel 46 a stronger lineup. With $19 million in revenue for 1985, WGNX more than doubled the billing of its primary competitor, WATL. WATL, which engineered its own rise to viability in the late 1980s, and WGNX gave Atlanta its first serious local independent stations. Atlanta Hawks basketball moved from WVEU (channel 69) to WGNX in the 1986–87 season.

In November 1993, Tribune committed to the new The WB Television Network, a new service to be launched by Warner Bros. Television in January 1995. Tribune would hold an ownership stake, and six of the company's seven independent stations, including WGNX, were initially to join at launch.

As a CBS station

A last-minute big switch 

On May 23, 1994, New World Communications signed a long-term agreement to affiliate its nine CBS-, ABC- or NBC-affiliated television stations with Fox, which had just acquired the television rights to the National Football Conference (NFC) of the National Football League. New World had a uniquely suited portfolio for Fox, with a series of key stations, many CBS affiliates, in important NFC football cities—including Atlanta, where it owned WAGA-TV (channel 5); Fox would sell WATL, which it had purchased and where a news department had been partially set up.

Rumors began to circulate wildly in the local industry following the announcement of the New World/Fox deal. General manager Herman Ramsey wrote a memo to his staff: "Have you ever heard so many rumors in a week and a half? ... I believe that the likelihood of WGNX affiliating with any network other than Warner Brothers in January '95 is small." Behind the scenes, however, Ramsey was lobbying Tribune to pursue the CBS affiliation for WGNX.

No deal had been reached by September, when CBS—acting out of desperation and needing to have a new affiliate in Atlanta by year's end—purchased WVEU for $22 million. A CBS move to WVEU would have meant an unprecedented campaign to build up the station, including major expenses in promotion and facilities and starting a local news service. One consultant interviewed by The Atlanta Journal-Constitution estimated CBS's total expenses in the venture as $100 million over several years.

Despite having agreed to buy WVEU, CBS continued to search for a stronger affiliate in Atlanta. It continued to negotiate with Fox and with Tribune, and by mid-November, the paperwork to purchase channel 69 had not been filed at the FCC. On November 16, it was announced that CBS would not be moving to WVEU but instead to WGNX, a station that already produced local newscasts, with CBS committing to buy WVEU and immediately resell it. Additionally, WATL was sold to Qwest Broadcasting (a joint venture between music producer Quincy Jones, former NFL defensive end Willie Davis, television producer Don Cornelius, television host Geraldo Rivera, and Tribune) in a two-station, $167-million deal, affiliating with The WB.

WGNX became Atlanta's new CBS affiliate on December 11, 1994. The Atlanta Hawks immediately moved to WATL.

Meredith ownership 

On August 23, 1998, Tribune Broadcasting announced it would sell WGNX to the Meredith Corporation for $370 million, as a three-way exchange deal in which Tribune would concurrently acquire Fox affiliate KCPQ in Tacoma, Washington, from Kelly Broadcasting. The trade made sense for Tribune and Meredith. Tribune's portfolio of stations at this point consisted entirely of Fox and WB affiliates outside of WGNX, and Meredith already owned several CBS stations, with Atlanta becoming its largest TV station and representing a rare opportunity to acquire a major station in a top-10 media market.

Meredith began to make aggressive changes in an attempt to turn around the laggard WGNX, a station described by Mediaweek magazine as "somewhat untended". It began construction of new studios in Midtown, replacing the Briarcliff facility that the station had outgrown for years, as part of a plan to increase news output from 90 minutes a day to five hours.

On July 4, 2000, to reflect these changes, WGNX changed its station branding from "CBS Atlanta"—adopted the year prior in a recognition that the station was not channel 46 on cable—to "Clear TV" and adopted the call sign WGCL-TV. The station began broadcasting its newscasts from the Midtown studio on March 25, 2001.

After the resignation of Allen Shaklan, WGNX/WGCL-TV's first general manager under Meredith, in 2002, the station dropped the format and hired Sue Schwartz, who had last run KTVK in Phoenix. Kevin O'Brien, president of Meredith's television station group, identified turning WGCL-TV around as the company's number one priority.

Beginning in 2009, Meredith began to hub master control operations for its two other southeastern stations—WHNS in Greenville, South Carolina, and WSMV-TV in Nashville—at WGCL-TV. By 2011, the hub was handling eight of Meredith's twelve stations.

On January 18, 2011, Meredith Corporation entered into a local marketing agreement with the Turner Broadcasting System, owner of WPCH-TV, to assume operational control of the station and move its operations to the WGCL-TV studios. Production of the station's 45 Atlanta Braves broadcasts was also transferred from Turner Sports to Fox Sports South as a result. Meredith purchased the station outright from Turner's corporate parent, Time Warner, in 2017; as the only broadcast license held by the company, its divestiture was intended to remove a potential hurdle to the acquisition of Time Warner by AT&T. From 2011 to 2013, WGCL-TV was the preseason television home of the Atlanta Falcons, with games moving to WUPA in 2014.

Sale to Gray Television; rebrand as "Atlanta News First" 

On May 3, 2021, locally based Gray Television announced its intent to purchase the Meredith Local Media division, including WGCL-TV and WPCH, for $2.7 billion. The sale was completed on December 1. For Gray, a company whose Georgia roots date to 1897, the acquisition of WGCL-TV has been the springboard for major investments in Atlanta-area media. In 2022, Gray spent $30 million to acquire WKTB-CD, Atlanta's Telemundo affiliate and the largest independently owned Telemundo outlet in the eastern United States, and co-owned Surge Digital Media, a boutique digital advertising agency; former owner Susan Sim Oh joined Gray at the conclusion of the sale, and Gray plans to relocate Telemundo Atlanta from its studios in Duluth to WGCL-TV. It also acquired WKSY-LD, a low-power station licensed to Summerville and Trion.

In addition, in 2021, Gray acquired Third Rail Studios, a film and television production facility located on the site of the former Doraville Assembly automobile plant in Doraville; it then announced a partnership with NBCUniversal to run Third Rail and a major expansion of the Assembly complex slated to be completed in 2023.

On August 31, 2022, Gray announced that WGCL-TV and WPCH's news programs would take on the umbrella brand of Atlanta News First, with WGCL-TV additionally changing its call sign to WANF, on October 3. In interviews, multiple station executives commented that the outgoing WGCL-TV had no brand at all.

News operation

Independent era
Even after Tribune—with its independent news operations in Chicago, New York, and Denver—acquired channel 46, news was not immediately on the station's radar due to its expense. However, ratings began to rise, and after must carry rules for TV stations on cable systems were removed in 1987, management felt that WGNX needed to differentiate itself from cable channels to retain carriage. At one meeting, Tribune Broadcasting president Jim Dowdle asked general manager Ramsey while standing in the station parking lot, "Don't get excited, not now, but if we were to put a newsroom in that building, where would it go?" After research showed enthusiasm for a possible newscast, the station prepared a cost-analysis to present to Tribune.

In July 1988, Tribune approved WGNX to start a 30-minute local newscast to air at 10 p.m. seven days a week. After an investment of several million dollars, Georgia's News at Ten began broadcasting on January 15, 1989; prior to its launch, Atlanta had been the largest market in the United States without an independent prime time newscast. The newscast, which focused on longer reports, won awards from journalists' organizations and increased its ratings; in June 1990, it expanded to an hour when USA Tonight, a nationally syndicated news program produced by Tribune, was discontinued.

Changes with CBS and Clear News
When WGNX became a CBS affiliate, the 10 p.m. newscast moved to 11 p.m., and a briefly aired 7:30 p.m. newscast was dropped. Over the course of the next several years, the station slowly expanded its news output, with noon and 7 p.m. local newscasts in 1995; the latter moved to 6 p.m. in 1996.

In 1997, one series of billboards for the station featured news anchors Karyn Greer and John McKnight next to the words "NAME 'EM", daring viewers to take an interest in the relative unknowns on channel 46; the station's newscasts were being outrated by other stations' presentations of syndicated shows including The Fresh Prince of Bel-Air, Family Matters, and M*A*S*H. By 1999, when Meredith took over, the 6 p.m. local news ranked seventh out of all seven major commercial stations in Atlanta in that time slot, and Allen Shaklan, the new general manager, noted that his station existed "below people's horizon of visibility". The station was producing just 90 minutes of news a day in three half-hour newscasts.

In 2000, as part of the image overhaul, with the new WGCL-TV call sign came a new moniker, Clear News, and a format focused on more substantive stories with fewer murders, fires, and accidents. The station also began airing a two-hour morning newscast and a 5 p.m. news hour as it was able to expand ahead of its move to Midtown. With the move, the station adopted a new green and gold set and theme music that was an orchestration of I Can See Clearly Now. However, Clear News was dismantled after the 2002 resignation of Allen Shaklin, and Sue Schwartz rebranded the station as "CBS 46, Atlanta's News Channel", with some limited initial success.

By 2005, the station had canceled its 5 p.m. newscast to focus on the less crowded 4 p.m. market and cut back its morning news presence to bolster its evening newscasts, which had the benefit of lead-ins from CBS prime time ratings. It then returned a 5 p.m. newscast in 2010, by which time it had expanded its morning newscast to  hours.

The station usually trails in local news ratings, behind WSB, WAGA and WXIA. Rodney Ho of The Atlanta Journal-Constitution described it in 2021 as "a bit of a revolving door news operation", noting that WGCL-TV has had nine different news directors since 2005.

Gray news expansions
After purchasing WGCL-TV–WPCH, Gray announced expansions in the news staff and offerings of the WGCL-TV newsroom, which was staffed by 50 to 60 people at the time Meredith sold it. In March 2022, Gray declared its intent to add 40 more news employees as well as 9 a.m. and 3 p.m. local newscasts. Two months later, WGCL-TV added a 7 p.m. newscast and a 7–9 a.m. morning newscast, the latter for air on WPCH-TV, bringing the total weekday news output across the two stations to 11 hours a day. The changes culminated in the implementation of the new Atlanta News First brand.

Notable current on-air staff
 Rick Folbaum – anchor
 Shon Gables – anchor
 Monica Kaufman Pearson – host

Notable former on-air staff
 Amanda Davis – anchor (2015–2017); died on December 27, 2017
 John Doyle – weathercaster (1997–2005)
 Tony Harris – anchor (2003–2004)
 Dagmar Midcap – weather anchor/reporter (2007–2010)
 Thomas Roberts – anchor (2018–2020)
 Jane Robelot – anchor (1999–2003)
 Brandon Rudat – anchor (2010–2013)
 Ben Swann – anchor and reporter (2015–2018)

Technical information

Subchannels
The station's digital signal is multiplexed:

Cozi TV and Grit were added as subchannels in 2015.

WPCH-TV is Atlanta's ATSC 3.0 (Next Gen TV) station. WANF broadcasts its primary subchannel and a standard-definition mirror of it, while WPCH-TV in turn broadcasts WANF in the new standard.

Analog-to-digital conversion
As WGCL-TV, this station shut down its analog signal over UHF channel 46 on June 12, 2009, as part of the federally mandated transition from analog to digital television; it retained its digital signal on UHF channel 19.

Notes

References

External links

ANF
CBS network affiliates
Cozi TV affiliates
Grit (TV network) affiliates
Television channels and stations established in 1971
Gray Television
Former Meredith Corporation subsidiaries